Gisa Radicchi Levi (1905-1985) was an Italian film editor of Jewish origins active in the Italian film industry between the 1930s and the 1960s.

Selected filmography 

 Die Slowly, You'll Enjoy It More (1967)
 An Angel for Satan (1966)
 Te lo leggo negli occhi (1965)
 The Thursday (1964)
 Gli imbroglioni (1963)
 Eighteen in the Sun (1962)
 Crazy Desire (1962)
 Totòtruffa '62 (1961)
 Sua Eccellenza si fermò a mangiare (1961)
 Totò, Fabrizi e i giovani d'oggi (1960)
 Signori si nasce (1960)
 Guardatele ma non toccatele (1959)
 Nel blu dipinto di blu (1959)
 Tipi da spiaggia (1959)
 Maid, Thief and Guard (1958)
 Toto, Peppino and the Fanatics (1958)
 L'uomo dai calzoni corti (1958)
 Peppino, le modelle e chella là (1957)
 Totò, Peppino e i fuorilegge (1956)
 Toto, Peppino, and the Hussy (1956)
 The Band of Honest Men (1956)
 Il coraggio (1955)
 Destination Piovarolo (1955)
 The Miller's Beautiful Wife (1955)
 Are We Men or Corporals? (1955)
 Totò all'inferno (1955)
 Town of Bells (1954)
 L'uomo la bestia e la virtù (1953)
 Hell Raiders of the Deep (1953)
 Husband and Wife (1952)
 Toto and the Women (1952)
 Filumena Marturano (1951)
 Cronaca nera (1947)
 Un giorno nella vita (1946)
 The Testimony (1946)
 Le miserie del signor Travet (1945)
 In High Places (1945)
 The Champion (1943)
 Malombra (1942)
 Piccolo mondo antico (1941)
 Frenzy (1939)
 The Faceless Voice (1939)

References

External links 

 

Italian film editors
Italian women film editors
1905 births
Film people from Turin
1985 deaths